A main station is a railway station that is the primary or central railway hub for a city.

Main station may in particular refer to:

Main station (CTA), on the purple line
Main station (CTA Niles Center Line)

See also
Main Street station (disambiguation)
Central station (disambiguation)